Plummer Mountain is a prominent summit of the North Cascades, in Snohomish County of Washington state. It is located west of Suiattle Pass in the heart of the Glacier Peak Wilderness on land managed by Mount Baker-Snoqualmie National Forest. Plummer Mountain is the high point and eastern culmination of Miners Ridge. Image Lake on Miners Ridge provides a campsite from which to climb Plummer. Kennecott Copper Corporation, as of 1988, planned to dig an open-pit copper mine on the slopes of Plummer Mountain. However, protests by various advocacy groups prevented the plan from developing further.

Geology
The area was previously an oceanic environment, consisting mainly of sedimentary and volcanic rocks. Glacier Peak, a stratovolcano that is south of Plummer Mountain, began forming in the mid-Pleistocene. Due to Glacier Peak's proximity to Plummer Mountain, volcanic ash is quite common in the area.

Throughout the ice age, the North Cascades were mostly covered in thick glaciers, extending to near Puget Sound. As a result, valleys in the area are deep and U-shaped, and mountains tend to be rocky, with steep slopes and narrow summits.

Climate
Plummer Mountain is located in the marine west coast climate zone of western North America. Most weather fronts originate in the Pacific Ocean, and travel northeast toward the Cascade Mountains. As fronts approach the North Cascades, they are forced upward by the peaks of the Cascade Range, causing them to drop their moisture in the form of rain or snowfall onto the Cascades (Orographic lift). As a result, the west side of the North Cascades experiences high precipitation, especially during the winter months in the form of snowfall. Because of maritime influence, snow tends to be wet and heavy, resulting in high avalanche danger.  During winter months, weather is usually cloudy, but due to high pressure systems over the Pacific Ocean that intensify during summer months, there is often little or no cloud cover during the summer. Due to its temperate climate and proximity to the Pacific Ocean, areas west of the Cascade Crest very rarely experience temperatures below  or above .

Hiking

The trail to Miners Ridge can be accessed from the Suiattle River Road. There is an alpine route with scrambling that leads from Miners Ridge to Plummer Mountain.

Gallery

See also

List of mountain peaks of Washington (state)

References

External links
 Weather forecast: Plummer Mountain
 Plummer West Face (photo): PBase
 Plummer West Ridge (photo): PBase

Mountains of Washington (state)
Mountains of Snohomish County, Washington
Cascade Range
North Cascades
North American 2000 m summits